Perhaps the first of what would become many notable mountain lists around the world was Sir Hugh Munro’s catalogue of the Munros, the peaks above 3,000’ elevation in Scotland. Once defined the list became a popular target for what became known as peak bagging, where the adventurous attempted to summit all of the peaks on the list.

Over time the peaks on such lists grew more challenging, with perhaps the eight-thousanders as the most notable (as of June 2019, a winter completion of all 14 eight-thousanders has still not been completed).  Other extreme examples are the Seven Summits, defined as the highest peaks on each of the seven continents.

An ever-growing collection of peak lists is maintained and published on mountaineering-related websites.

Worldwide 
The Seven Summits are the highest peaks on each continent, from the Vinson Massif in Antarctica to Everest in Asia.
The Seven Second Summits are the second highest peaks on each continent. Climber and writer Jon Krakauer, survivor of the 1996 Everest Disaster, argues that a true climber would find more reward in ascending these largely more technical, demanding climbs.

The Volcanic Seven Summits are the highest volcanoes on each of the continents.
The Ultras are mountains worldwide that have a topographic prominence of at least , regardless of location, absolute height or other merit.

Europe
The Six mountains of the Alps with the most difficult north faces.

British Isles

The hills of Britain and Ireland are classified into various lists for 'peak-bagging' purposes. Among the better-known lists are the following:

The Furths: mountains in the British Isles, that would qualify as Munros, but are not in Scotland; there are 34 Furths in the British Isles.
The P600 (the "Majors"): mountains in the British Isles with a prominence above ; there are 120 P600s.
The Marilyns: hills and mountains in the British Isles with a prominence above , regardless of height or other merit;  there are 2,011 Marilyns
The Simms: mountains in the British Isles above , with a prominence above ; there are 2,754 Simms.
 The Wainwrights: the 214 fells in the English Lake District that have a chapter in one of Alfred Wainwright's Pictorial Guides to the Lakeland Fells.
There are 273 Vandeleur-Lynams in Ireland.
The Nutalls : A list of all mountains in England and Wales over 2,000 ft (609.6m) with more than a  49.2 ft (15m) prominence.

North America
The 125 major 4000-meter summits of North America.

Canada
The 19 major 4000-metre summits of Canada.

Mexico
The eight major 4000-meter summits of Mexico.

United States
The 104 major 4000-meter summits of the United States.
the 53 Colorado fourteeners,
the 12 California fourteeners, and
Mount Rainier and Liberty Cap  in the State of Washington.
 Several peakbagging sections of the Sierra Club's Angeles Chapter maintain lists of notable peaks, and organize outings to climb them.
 The Sierra Peaks Section keeps a list of peaks in the Sierra Nevada, and a series of emblems (levels) for climbing many them.
 The Desert Peaks Section climbs peaks in deserts of the Southwestern U.S. and Baja Mexico.
 The Great Basin Peaks List maintained by Toiyabe Chapter of the Sierra Club  
 The 46 highest peaks in New York's Adirondack Mountains (or rather, the list of 46 peaks once thought to be the highest. Successful completers are eligible for membership in the Adirondack Forty-Sixers)
 The 48 peaks over 4,000 feet (1,219 m) in the White Mountains of New Hampshire.
 The highest 100 peaks in New Hampshire
 The highest 100 peaks in New England.
 The "Fifty Finest" peaks in New England (those with the most topographic prominence)
 All peaks in the Catskill Mountains over .Those who climb these, plus four of them a second time in winter, are eligible for membership in the Catskill Mountain 3500 Club.
 The Southern Sixers, or South Beyond 6000: all 40 peaks above . in the southern Appalachians, which are in either North Carolina or Tennessee. Technically, there are more than forty  mountains in the Southern Appalachians, but the list does not include mountains with peaks that have restricted access.
These include the 40 Southern Sixers, plus Mount Washington (New Hampshire).
 The Saranac Lake 6er, 6 peaks in the Adirondacks of New York State that surround the town of Saranac Lake. Ultra club membership is awarded to those who can complete all 6 mountains in a 24-hour period. There is also a winter 6er.
 Adirondack Mountain Club Fire Tower Challenge. Started by the Glens Falls-Saratoga Chapter of the Adirondack Mountain Club, hikers visit 18 of 23 fire tower summits inside New York State's Adirondack Park and all five in the Catskills.

Central America

Guatemala
The two major 4000 meter summits of Guatemala.

South America
The standard list for the major peaks of the Andes is the list of 6000 m peaks as first compiled by John Biggar in 1996 and listed in his Andes guidebook. This list currently stands at 102 peaks, with no known completers.

Asia

China
 Sacred Mountains of China, including
 The Five Great Mountains of Ancient China
 The Four Sacred Mountains of Buddhism

Japan
100 Famous Japanese Mountains - The major summits in Japan selected by Kyūya Fukada
Three-thousanders (in Japan) -  The 21 major 3000 meter summits in Japan

Indonesia
List of ribus, peaks Indonesia with at least  of topographic prominence, known as the Ribus.

Taiwan
The 100 Peaks of Taiwan

Australia
Popular peak-bagging challenges in Australia include the State 8: the highest peak in each of the six states and two territories (excluding Australia's external territories).

The Abels are a group of peaks in Tasmania over 1100 metres above sea level and separated from other mountains by a drop of at least 150 metres on all sides. Named after Abel Tasman, the first European to sight Tasmania.

See also

 Lists of mountains
 List of highest mountains
 Lists of highest points
 Lists of mountains by region

References